Club Gimnasia y Esgrima de Concepción del Uruguay is an Argentine football club from the city of Concepción del Uruguay in Entre Ríos Province. The team currently plays in Torneo Argentino A, the regionalised third division of the Argentine football league system.

Gimnasia y Esgrima has played a single season at national level, competing in Primera B Nacional in 1996–97, but was soon relegated with the 2nd worst points average of the teams from the Interior.

Titles
Torneo Argentino A: 1
 1997
Torneo del Interior: 1
 1995
Liga de Concepción del Uruguay: 41
 1921, 1923, 1925, 1927, 1928, 1929, 1930, 1934, 1935, 1938, 1939, 1942, 1943, 1945, 1947, 1950, 1951, 1952, 1953, 1954, 1956, 1958, 1959, 1960, 1961, 1962, 1966, 1973, 1976, 1977, 1980, 1984, 1985, 1987, 1988, 1989, 1990, 1991, 1992, 1993, 1994

See also
List of football clubs in Argentina
Argentine football league system

External links

Official website 

Gimnasia y Esgrima (Concepcion del Uruguay)
Association football clubs established in 1917
1917 establishments in Argentina